Carlos Mazón Guixot (born 8 April 1974) is a Spanish People's Party (PP) politician. He was elected president of the Provincial Deputation of the Province of Alicante in 2019 and has led the People's Party of the Valencian Community (PPCV) since 2021.

Biography
Born in Alicante, Mazón's father of the same name was a haemotologist, who had a street in the city named after him. His maternal grandfather, Alfonso Guixot, was a businessman involved in entertainment; he owned cinemas and a bullring, and was president of Hércules CF football club. 

Mazón graduated in law from the University of Alicante, where he was a member of the student council as the leader of the union Programa 10. He was a member of the New Generations of the People's Party. When the PP entered government in the Valencian Community under Eduardo Zaplana after the 1999 elections, 25-year-old Mazón became director of the Valencian Youth Institute.

In 2003, under new Valencian president Francisco Camps, Mazón led the Department of Commerce and Consumption. Four years later, following a rift in the People's Party of the Valencian Community (PPCV) between followers of Zaplana and Camps, he was one of the members of the former, more liberal faction that left regional politics and moved into the politics of the Province of Alicante. He served as a councillor in the provincial capital and in the small town of Catral, as well as being director of the Chamber of Commerce and a member of the Provincial Deputation.

Mazón was elected President of the Provincial Deputation of Alicante in July 2019, receiving support from Citizens to be the fifth consecutive PP president since 1995. A year later, he received 98% of the votes to lead the PP branch in his province. In July 2021, he succeeded Isabel Bonig as leader on a regional level.

Personal life
Mazón is a member of the four-piece band Marengo, which auditioned to represent Spain in the Eurovision Song Contest 2011. In 2013, the band toured the Province of Alicante and the Region of Murcia.

References

1974 births
Living people
People from Alicante
University of Alicante alumni
People's Party (Spain) politicians
Politicians from the Valencian Community